The Paykan ( meaning Arrow) is the first Iranian-made car produced by Iran Khodro (formerly called "Iran National") between 1967 and 2005. The car - a licensed version of the British Rootes Arrow (Hillman Hunter) - was very popular in Iran from its introduction until its discontinuation. It is often colloquially referred as the Iranian chariot.

The Paykan spawned some locally developed variants as well as the original Hillman Hunter derived sedan (most notably, the pickup, which used a different body shell from the one sold elsewhere).

History

The design was introduced to Iran by Mahmoud Khayami, co-founder and, by then, owner of the Iran Khodro (formerly called "Iran National") company and factory, who accurately predicted that Iran was in need of a simple "no-frills" motorcar within the price range of ordinary people.

The car itself originated in 1966 as the "Arrow" series of vehicles (the most prolific version of which was badged as the Hillman Hunter); designed and manufactured by the Rootes Group, which was the British wing of Chrysler Europe.  In 1967, Rootes began exporting Hillman Hunters to Iran Khodro in "complete knock down" (CKD) kit form, for assembly in Iran. By the mid-1970s, full-scale manufacturing of the car (minus the engine) had started in Iran.

In 1977, Roy Axe designed a new Paykan facelift model using many interior and exterior parts from the Chrysler Alpine.

In 1978, PSA Peugeot Citroën purchased the ailing Chrysler Europe after Chrysler exited the European market; and with it acquired the rights to the Hillman Hunter/Arrow design. A year later, Peugeot ended Hillman Hunter production in Ireland. Following this, the Paykan's engine production tooling was moved to Iran and was in full-scale manufacturing under Peugeot licence. This ended in 2005 with the final Paykan leaving the assembly line.

Irankhodro tried to replace Paykan with a so-called "New Paykan" but Peugeot did not agree with the naming. This revealed the fact that the intellectual ownership of the Paykan brand and logo still belongs to PSA Peugeot Citroën, as a legacy of Rootes Group.

Design
Although the Paykan was based on a 1966 Hillman Hunter, there were many changes and modifications made to it over the years – notably the substitution of the original 1725cc Rootes engine with a Peugeot 504-derived unit. The modifications to the exterior included revised headlights and taillights. A Paykan Pickup was also offered. There was another pickup truck based on the Hillman Hunter sold in South Africa – the Dodge Husky – but the two models used different bodies. The South African version has a thicker B-pillar and retains the saloon's lines along the side panels. The tailgate and rear window are also subtly different.

The Iranian government reportedly offered Iran Khodro a large cash incentive to end Paykan production by 2005, labelling the car as an environmental hazard because of its unacceptably high fuel consumption. During its last years, the order backlog was nearly two years long.

The Samand, commonly referred to as the "New Paykan", is currently being produced by Iran Khodro as a modern substitute for the Paykan class of cars.  In 2005, Iran Khodro announced that it had sold the discontinued Paykan's motorcar production line to the Khartoum Transport Company in Sudan, while car-parts production for the Paykan still continues by third-party manufacturers in Iran.

Legacy 
Despite the vehicle being fully discontinued in 2015, the Paykan still left its mark on the Iranian automotive industry. The Peugeot ROA, which is still produced today, shares the Paykan chassis, although its bodyshell is from Peugeot 405. A similar vehicle based on the Paykan chassis is also produced under the IKCO Arisun name, although it is stylistically based on Peugeot 405.

See also
Automotive industry in Iran
PaykanArtCar, art project involving a Paykan

References

External links

 Iran Khodro Industrial Group
 Paykan history
  News story: Iranian car hits end of the road

Iran Khodro vehicles
Rear-wheel-drive vehicles
Sedans
1970s cars
1980s cars
1990s cars
2000s cars
Iranian brands
Cars introduced in 1967